The 22893 / 22894 Sainagar Shirdi–Howrah Superfast Express is one of the Superfast, as well as the like other normal Superfast trains. It is the newer train. At any given time the Sainagar Shirdi Howrah SF Express always gets the normal priority like other express, on any line.

The Sainagar Shirdi Howrah SF Express leaves Sainagar Shirdi railway station for Howrah railway station, to cover a distance of   km in 29 hours 35 mins. It had an 1-1 AC 2 & 3-tier and 8 3-tier sleeper. Also, The train is the first Express train between Sainagar Shirdi and Howrah in India and other all trains are Superfast Express trains in India.

History
Before it started, there was only one train which connected Sainagar Shirdi to Howrah.

Accommodations
The trains have normal priority on the Indian railway network. The trains offer four classes of accommodation: second class AC 2-tier (bays of 4 berths + 2 berth on the side) with open system berth, second class AC 3-tier (bays of 6 berths + 2 berths on the side) it also with open system berth and second class 3 tier sleeper (bays of 6 berths + 2 berths on the side). Generally it has 1 AC 2-tiers and 1 AC 3-tiers (both of which may be increased according to demand), it has 8 second class 3 tier sleeper (which may be increased according to demand), it has no pantry car, 5 GEN (unreserved) and 2 SLR (second-class luggage/parcel van + guard van ('G' missing) see note for 'GS' above).

Schedule

Route & Halts
The major stops on the first route are:

Traction
The train is hauled by a -based WAP-7 locomotive from end to end.

Coach composition

Rake sharing

22857/22858 – Santragachi–Anand Vihar Superfast Express

See also

Express trains in India
List of named passenger trains in India

References

Transport in Shirdi
Rail transport in Howrah
Express trains in India
Rail transport in Maharashtra
Rail transport in Chhattisgarh
Rail transport in Odisha
Rail transport in Jharkhand
Rail transport in West Bengal
Railway services introduced in 2013
2013 establishments in India